Palpita spilogramma is a moth in the family Crambidae. It is found in Fiji.

References

Moths described in 1934
Palpita
Moths of Fiji